Paul Simon Arnison (born 18 September 1977) is an English former footballer who played as a defensive midfielder. He last played for National Premier League Queensland club Sunshine Coast FC, where he was also employed as a coach.

He is a former Newcastle United trainee, who has also played for his hometown club Hartlepool United, as well as Carlisle United, Bradford City, Darlington and Celtic Nation

Club career

Early career
Born in Hartlepool, Arnison started his career at Newcastle United, where failed to make an appearance. He joined his hometown club Hartlepool United firstly on loan, then after joining on a permanent basis he scored on his home debut at Victoria Park.

Hartlepool United
During the 2001–02 season, Arnison was limited to 19 league games, but helped Hartlepool to reach the play-off semi-finals. Arnison scored his first goal of the season during the play-off semi-final second leg against Cheltenham Town. However, after the result finished 2–2 on aggregate, Arnison and Hartlepool were knocked out on penalties. During the summer, Arnison signed a contract extension, along with fellow defender Chris Westwood and top goalscorer Gordon Watson, to stay at Hartlepool for another season. Arnison was offered another deal at the end of the following season by new boss Mike Newell after Pools had secured promotion to Division Two.

Carlisle United
However, after just over three years with Hartlepool, he joined Carlisle United in October 2003 on a three-month loan. He signed a full contract with Carlisle at the end of this loan deal but was relegated with Carlisle to the Conference National in his first season but managed to secure back-to-back promotions to see Carlisle playing their  football in League One in 2006. Arnison played more than 100 league and cup games for Carlisle signing new contract extensions at the end of the 2004–05 and 2005–06 seasons. Just five months later, Arnison signed a further 12-month contract extension, keeping him at Carlisle until June 2008. He made the right back position his own, but he has competition at the right back position with David Raven joining Carlisle United. Arnison started in Carlisle's 2–1 first leg play-off victory over Leeds United on 12 May 2008. But he missed their second leg defeat three days later, and on 16 May 2008, Arnison was one of three players to be released by manager John Ward.

Bradford City
He earned interest for a number of clubs, before he signed a two-year contract at League Two side Bradford City on 18 June 2008. He was one of four Bradford players to make his debut on the opening day of the 2008–09 season against Notts County. Arnison made Bradford's first goal for Peter Thorne, was booked and was substituted in the second half, as Bradford won 2–1. Arnison started the first seven games of the season before he was substituted against AFC Bournemouth because of an injury; it was later diagnosed as a muscle tear, which gave TJ Moncur the chance to deputise at right back. He failed to win his place back in the team until he returned in December for a 2–1 defeat at Brentford.

During the summer of 2009, his manager Stuart McCall signed two new full backs, Simon Ramsden and Jonathan Bateson, leaving Arnison surplus to requirements at Bradford.

Darlington and non-league
Paul was asked to find a new club and had a trial with League Two rivals Darlington playing 40 minutes of a friendly against Sunderland. He played in another pre-season friendly, and along with fellow Bradford defender Mark Bower, he joined Darlington following his release from Bradford City. Darlington suffered financial difficulties during Arnison's time at the club and his contract was terminated on 16 January 2012, along with the rest of the playing squad and caretaker manager Craig Liddle. The following day, a rescue bid led to the reinstatement of many of the club's players including Arnison. At end of the season, Arnison left the club as Darlington were relegated to the Northern Football League and reformed as Darlington 1883.

During his time at Darlington, Arnison played a part in Darlington's 2011 FA Trophy victory.

Arnison dropped back into Non-league football, joining Celtic Nation during the 2012–13 close season break where he joined up with his former teammates Adam Boyd, Graeme Lee and Jeff Smith.

Emigration to Australia
Arnison left Celtic Nation in early January 2013 to emigrate to Australia, Arnison stated his intention to continue playing in Australia, with former teammate Michael Bridges helping him find a club in the minor leagues, where he became a player-coach for National Premier Leagues Queensland side Sunshine Coast. he later become manager of the team, but resigned one week out from the start of the 2016 season.

Personal life
Arnison is married to Amanda, who works as a nurse practitioner and the couple have two sons; Harry and Alfie.

Honours
Hartlepool United
Football League Third Division Runner-Up (Promotion): 2002–03

Carlisle United
 Football Conference Play-Offs: 2004-05
 Football League Two Champions: 2005–06
 Football League Trophy runner-up: 2006

Darlington
FA Trophy: 2011

References

External links

Living people
1977 births
Footballers from Hartlepool
People educated at English Martyrs School and Sixth Form College
English footballers
Association football fullbacks
Newcastle United F.C. players
Hartlepool United F.C. players
Carlisle United F.C. players
Bradford City A.F.C. players
Darlington F.C. players
Celtic Nation F.C. players
English Football League players
National League (English football) players
Northern Football League players
National Premier Leagues players
Association football coaches